Ahmad Nesar (born 7 December 1958) is a former Afghanistan boxer, who competed at the 1980 Summer Olympic Games in the bantamweight event.

1980 Olympic results
Below is the record of Ahmad Nesar, an Afghani bantamweight boxer who competed at the 1980 Moscow Olympics:

 Round of 32: lost to Ayele Mohammed (Ethiopia) by decision, 0-5

References

External links
 

Boxers at the 1980 Summer Olympics
Olympic boxers of Afghanistan
1958 births
Living people
Place of birth missing (living people)
Afghan male boxers
Bantamweight boxers